Sue Weisenbarger Kelly (née Madelyn Sue Weisenbarger; born September 26, 1936) is an American businesswoman and politician who served as a Republican member of the United States House of Representatives from 1995 to 2007, representing New York's 19th District. She was elected to the seat that had been held by Republican Hamilton Fish IV after he dropped out of the 1994 race due to prostate cancer. Kelly defeated his son, Hamilton Fish V, in that race and served until John Hall defeated her in the 2006 congressional election.

Kelly served from February 1999 to April 2001 as Chair of the House Page Board, which came under fire during the Mark Foley scandal.

Early life and career
Sue Kelly was born in Lima, Ohio, on September 26, 1936. She was raised Presbyterian and graduated from Denison University in 1958. She also holds a Master's degree from Sarah Lawrence College.

She held jobs as a small business owner, patient advocate, rape counselor, and educator. She first became involved in politics by working as an advisor and campaign manager for Hamilton Fish IV, who represented Kelly’s home area in New York’s Hudson Valley.

Campaigns
When Congressman Hamilton Fish IV, a Republican, decided not to seek re-election in 1994, Kelly sought and won the nomination for the congressional seat. Kelly defeated Fish's son, Hamilton Fish V, who ran as a Democrat, and Conservative Party candidate Joseph DioGuardi, who had been defeated by her in the Republican primary but continued campaigning. She was re-elected by a seven-point margin in 1996 and had comfortable victory margins in her campaigns thereafter. In 2004, Kelly easily won re-election with 67% of the vote in New York's 19th Congressional district although The New York Times described Kelly's opponents in previous races as "token opposition".

Views
Kelly highlighted a socially moderate and fiscally conservative voting record. A 2006 survey of congressional power and effectiveness by the nonpartisan company, Knowlegis, indicated that Rep. Kelly was among the 100 most powerful lawmakers in the 435-member House. The survey also labelled Kelly as the second most powerful congressperson in the New York delegation, second only to Thomas M. Reynolds, who was chairman of the National Republican Congressional Committee.

2006 election
On November 7, 2006, Kelly was narrowly defeated by Democratic opponent John Hall by less than 4700 votes. On November 16, nine days after the election, she conceded the election. The state certified the official voting results on December 15, 2006. It is notable that although Hall barely outperformed Kelly's previous Democratic challengers in 2004, 2002, and 2000, Kelly herself received over 80,000 fewer votes than she had in 2004.

Initially, Hall's candidacy was considered a "long-shot," but he gained momentum after Kelly faced criticism in October 2006 for her connection to the Mark Foley scandal. Kelly refused to speak to a reporter from a local news network about the matter and also did not appear at a televised debate sponsored  by the League of Women Voters. Kelly was represented by an empty chair at the debate. 

Kelly was endorsed by the League of Conservation Voters, an environmental advocacy group. Her score of 92% was the highest among any Republican Member of Congress in 2006. Kelly had earned a 17% score from the LCV in 2005, but attributed that score to the many missed votes that came in the several days she was absent due to a death in the family.

Kelly stated she was an "independent voice" in Congress, but the Times Herald Record noted that in 25 of the closest House votes during her last session, Kelly sided with the Republican leadership 24 of those times.

In 2006, comedian Stephen Colbert invited Kelly to an interview for his "Better Know a District" segment on The Colbert Report. Upon Kelly's refusal, Colbert interviewed Kelly's challenger, John Hall. Colbert took credit for Hall's election win on the November 8, 2006, edition of The Colbert Report.

Ratings from special interest groups
Kelly was a member of The Republican Majority For Choice, Republicans for Choice, The Wish List, The Republican Main Street Partnership, and Republicans for Environmental Protection. She received an average score of 30% from NARAL from 1994 to 2005, and an average of 71% from 2000–2005. Her Sierra Club rating of 63% was 8th highest among Republicans during her congressional career, and 159th overall in the House. Some seniors advocacy groups have questioned her votes on Social Security and Medicare. The Sierra Club chose to endorse her competitor in 2006.  She has a lifetime rating of 64% from the American Conservative Union demonstrating a moderate to conservative voting record.

Kelly, a former small business owner, received a 22% rating from the US Women's Chamber of Commerce.  She received a grade of a C+ from the Iraq and Afghanistan Veterans of America,  an issue which she felt strongly on because of her nephew's service in Iraq and Afghanistan with the United States Special Forces. Kelly voted in favor of so-called "pork amendments 84% of the time according to the conservative Club for Growth,  and has declined to answer questions from the National Taxpayers Union, a non-partisan group focused on taxpayer's waste.

In February 2006, the House voted 216 to 214 to cut domestic spending by $39 billion, primarily by cutting $11 billion from Medicaid and another $12.7 billion from federal student loans, which led to protest  in her district. Sue Kelly and Frank LoBiondo (NJ-02) were the deciding votes.

She voted for the Federal Marriage Amendment in 2004 and in 2006, a bill to permanently ban gay marriage in all states. These votes cost her the endorsement of the Human Rights Campaign, which had supported her campaigns prior to 2004. Her rating on the Human Rights Campaign Congressional Scorecard is 25%.

Personal life
She is married to Edward Kelly, and they live in Katonah, New York. They have four children and eight grandchildren.

See also
 Women in the United States House of Representatives

References

External links 
 
 

|-

|-

1936 births
Living people
21st-century American politicians
21st-century American women politicians
American Presbyterians
Denison University alumni
Female members of the United States House of Representatives
People from Katonah, New York
Politicians from Lima, Ohio
Republican Party members of the United States House of Representatives from New York (state)
Politicians from Rockland County, New York
Sarah Lawrence College alumni
Politicians from Westchester County, New York
Women in New York (state) politics